"I Get a Kick Out of You" is a song by Cole Porter, which was first sung in the 1934 Broadway musical Anything Goes, and then in the 1936 film version. Originally sung by Ethel Merman, it has been covered by dozens of prominent performers, including Frank Sinatra, Dolly Parton, and Ella Fitzgerald. A cover by Mel Tormé won the 1996 Grammy Award for Best Instrumental Arrangement with Accompanying Vocal(s) for arranger Rob McConnell, while a duet version by Tony Bennett and Lady Gaga was nominated for three awards at the 2022 ceremony, including Record of the Year.

Alterations to the song
The lyrics were first altered shortly after being written. The last verse originally went as follows:

After the 1932 Lindbergh kidnapping, Porter changed the second and third lines to:

In the 1936 movie version, alternative lyrics in the second verse were provided to replace a reference to the drug cocaine, which was not allowed by Hollywood's Production Code of 1934.

The original verse goes as follows:

Porter changed the first line to:

Frank Sinatra recorded both pre-Code and post-Code versions (with and without the cocaine reference): the first in 1953 and the second in 1962. On a recording live in Paris in 1962 (not released until 1994), Sinatra sings the altered version with the first line as "Some like the perfume from Spain". Other Porter-approved substitutions include "whiff of Guerlain." There is also a version with the lines "Some like the bop-type refrain, I'm sure that if I heard even one riff..." on Sinatra and Swingin' Brass.

All three of the above alternatives are mentioned in the liner notes to Joan Morris and William Bolcom's CD, Night and Day; on the recording, Morris sings the original second verse.

Tony Bennett and Lady Gaga version

Background and reception
Tony Bennett and Lady Gaga recorded a version of the song for their second collaborative album, Love for Sale. It was released as the first single from the album on August 3, 2021, to digital retailers. The recording sessions for the song took place at Electric Lady Studios in downtown New York City. AARP the Magazine revealed that Bennett was a "considerably more muted presence during the recording of the new album with Gaga", as he was diagnosed with Alzheimer's disease in 2016, before the sessions began. The duo's version is "a campy take" on "I Get a Kick Out of You". They are backed by "jaunty piano" at the beginning of the track, with Gaga slowly starting the song with the line "My story is much too sad to be told, but practically everything leads me totally cold." Bennett then picks up with "The only exception I know is the case..." line, and when he says “Then, I see your fabulous face", Gaga jokingly asks Bennett, "Are you talking about me?" The big band arrangement then commences, and accompanies the two for the rest of the song.

Rolling Stone Jon Blistein described the song as "delightfully classic", and thought that "the two vocalists exude plenty of chemistry". Heran Mamo of Billboard opined that while Gaga's "portion of the first verse does anything but leave us totally cold", Bennett's "beautifully raspy vocals leave his counterpart emotional", and thought that "the full band breathes new life into Cole Porter's classic tune". Helen Brown of The Independent thought the song revolves around "the mutual appreciation" of the pair for each other, "on which Bennett nails the dizzying internal rhyme scheme of lines such as: 'Flying too high with some girl in the sky is my idea of nothing to do...'" Neil McCormick of The Daily Telegraph found Gaga and Bennett sounding the happiest on the album when they are "diving into the witty wordplay" of "I Get a Kick Out of You" and "You're the Top". Alexis Petridis of The Guardian thought the song was evidence that Bennett's health condition didn't seem to affect the chemistry between the duo. Athena Serrano from MTV noted that "Bennett doesn't fail to deliver his strong vocals even at 95." At The Arts Desk, Sebastian Scotney highlighted the track for its "genuinely touching moment" where "Bennett finds that authentically urgent and passionate vocal colour he had in tracks such as "A Child is Born" or "Make Someone Happy" on the classic album Together Again with Bill Evans." While reviewing the album, Robin Murray of Clash wrote that "Love For Sale hinges on the neat chemistry between the two, their nimble performances fuelling a later turn on 'I Get A Kick Out Of You'."

Music video
The accompanying music video premiered on MTV on August 6, 2021. It begins with Bennett saying "All set", and Gaga laughing and stating that "Tony's always ready". It then shows Bennett and Gaga recording the song, while they smile at each other and hug several times emotionally. Gaga appears wearing a simple black dress, while Bennett wears a blue suit and tie. The video shows Bennett snapping his fingers, lending several thumbs up to the instrumental proceedings, and winking at Gaga. At one moment of the video, Gaga rests her head on Bennett's shoulder, while another part shows a closeup of Gaga, revealing tears in her eyes. The video had a positive  reception, with critics calling it "heartwarming", "emotional" and "sweet".

Accolades
The song was nominated for Record of the Year and Best Pop Duo/Group Performance at the 64th Annual Grammy Awards, while its music video received a nomination in the Best Music Video category.

Release history

Other covers

 In 1968, schlager singer Hildegard Knef released a version of the song with German lyrics by Mischa Mleinek titled "Nichts haut mich um, aber du" ("Nothing Knocks Me Over But You").

 In 1974, Australian singer Gary Shearston released a 1920s/30s style version. Issued on the Charisma label, it entered the UK Singles Chart on October 5, 1974, and had an eight week run on the charts with a peak position of No. 7.

References

1934 songs
Songs written by Cole Porter
Songs from Anything Goes
Ethel Merman songs
Frank Sinatra songs
Ella Fitzgerald songs
Shirley Bassey songs
Grammy Award for Best Instrumental Arrangement Accompanying Vocalist(s)
Pop standards
Columbia Records singles
Interscope Records singles